George Glenn Strange (August 16, 1899 – September 20, 1973) was an American actor who mostly appeared in Western films and was billed as Glenn Strange. He is best remembered for playing Frankenstein's monster in three Universal films during the 1940s and for his role as Sam Noonan, the bartender on CBS's Gunsmoke television series.

Early life
Strange was born in Weed, New Mexico Territory, 13 years prior to New Mexico gaining statehood.

Strange grew up in the West Texas town of Cross Cut. His father was a bartender and later a rancher. Strange learned by ear how to play the fiddle and guitar. By the time he was 12, he was performing at cowboy dances. By 1928, he was on radio in El Paso, Texas. He was a young rancher, but in 1930, he came to Hollywood as a member of the radio singing group Arizona Wranglers. Strange joined the singers after having appeared at a rodeo in Prescott, Arizona.

Career
In 1932, Strange had a minor role as part of the Wrecker's gang in a 12-part serial, The Hurricane Express, starring John Wayne. He gained his first motion picture role in 1932, and appeared in hundreds of films during his lifetime. He played numerous small parts in Paramount's popular Hopalong Cassidy film series, usually cast as a member of an outlaw's gang and occasionally as a local sheriff.  In 1943, he played a badman in the Hopalong Cassidy movie False Colors. Beginning in 1949, he portrayed Butch Cavendish, the villain responsible for killing all of the Texas Rangers except one in the long-running television series The Lone Ranger.

Strange appeared twice as Jim Wade on Bill Williams's syndicated Western series geared to juvenile audiences The Adventures of Kit Carson. He also appeared twice as Blake in the syndicated Western The Cisco Kid. In 1952, he was cast in the role of Chief Black Cloud in the episode "Indian War Party" of the syndicated The Range Rider. In 1954, Strange played Sheriff Billy Rowland in Jim Davis's syndicated Western series Stories of the Century. Strange appeared six times in 1956 in multiple roles on Edgar Buchanan's syndicated Judge Roy Bean. That same year, Strange appeared in an uncredited role as the sheriff in Silver Rapids in the Western movie The Fastest Gun Alive starring Glenn Ford. In 1958, he had a minor part in an episode of John Payne's The Restless Gun, and had an important role in the 1958 episode "Chain Gang" of the Western series 26 Men, true stories about the Arizona Rangers.  That same year, he played rancher Pat Cafferty, who faces the threat of anthrax, in the episode "Queen of the Cimarron" of the syndicated Western series, Frontier Doctor. Strange appeared in six episodes of The Rifleman playing the same role in different variations: Cole, the stagecoach driver, in "Duel of Honor"; a stagecoach shotgun guard in "The Dead-eye Kid"; Joey, a stagecoach driver in "The Woman"; and an unnamed stagecoach driver in "The Blowout", "The Spiked Rifle", and "Miss Bertie".

Strange was cast in five episodes of the ABC Western The Life and Legend of Wyatt Earp and three segments of the syndicated Annie Oakley. In 1959, he appeared in another Western syndicated series, Mackenzie's Raiders, in the episode entitled "Apache Boy". Strange was cast twice on Kirby Grant's Western aviation adventure series, Sky King, as Rip Owen in Stage Coach Robbers (1952), and as Link in Dead Giveaway (1958).

He first appeared on Gunsmoke in 1959 and assumed several roles on the long-running program before he was permanently cast as stolid bartender Sam Noonan, a role he played from 1961 until 1973.

Frankenstein's monster 

 

In 1942, he appeared in The Mad Monster for PRC, a poverty row studio. In 1944, while Strange was being made up for an action film at Universal, make-up artist Jack Pierce noticed that Strange's facial features and 6'5" height would be appropriate for the role of Frankenstein's monster. Strange was cast in 1944 film House of Frankenstein in the role created by Boris Karloff in Frankenstein (1931), coached by Karloff personally after hours.

Strange recounted a personal anecdote in Ted Newsom's documentary, 100 Years of Horror (1996). On the set of House of Dracula (1945), Lon Chaney, Jr., got him extremely inebriated. In the scene in which the monster is discovered in a cave, Strange lay immersed for hours in "faked quicksand" (actually cold mud) waiting for the cameras to roll. As Glenn began to get a serious chill, Chaney recommended that alcohol would keep Strange warm. Strange could barely walk straight after the day's shooting.

Strange played the monster a third time in Abbott and Costello Meet Frankenstein (1948), with Chaney, Jr. as the Wolf Man and Bela Lugosi in his second screen appearance as Count Dracula. Strange also appeared in character with Lou Costello in a haunted house skit on The Colgate Comedy Hour and made a gag publicity appearance as a masked flagpole-sitter for a local Los Angeles TV show in the 1950s. After weeks of the station teasing the public about the sitter's identity, Strange removed his mask and revealed himself as Frankenstein's monster (actually, yet another mask.) Strange also played a monster in the Bowery Boys horror-comedy Master Minds in 1949, mimicking the brain-transplanted Huntz Hall's frantic comedy movements, with Hall providing his own dubbed voice.

During the wave of monster-related merchandising in the late 1950s and 1960s,  Glenn Strange's iconic image often was used for the monster on toys, games, and paraphernalia, most often from his appearance in the Abbott and Costello film. In 1969, The New York Times mistakenly published Boris Karloff's obituary with Glenn Strange's picture as the Frankenstein monster.

Personal life
Strange was 6 ft 5 in tall and weighed 220 lbs. His first wife was Flora Hooper of Duncan, Oklahoma. They had two daughters, Wynema and Juanita. Strange was married from 1937 to his death in 1973 to his second wife, Minnie Thompson (1911–2004). The couple had one child, Janine Laraine Strange (born 1939). He had Irish and Cherokee descent through his father. In addition, Strange was an eighth-generation great-grandson of John Rolfe and Pocahontas through his maternal grandfather.

Death
On September 20, 1973, at age 74, Strange died of lung cancer in Los Angeles, California. Singer Eddie Dean, with whom Strange had collaborated on various songs and opening themes for films, sang at Strange's funeral service as a final tribute. Strange is interred at Forest Lawn - Hollywood Hills Cemetery. In 1975, two years after Strange's death, his Gunsmoke costar Buck Taylor named his third son Cooper Glenn Taylor after Strange.

Selected filmography

Shotgun Pass (1931) – Pee Wee (uncredited)
Cavalier of the West (1931) – Trooper (uncredited)
The Gay Buckaroo (1931) – Barfly (uncredited)
Single-Handed Sanders (1932) – Gang Leader (uncredited)
The Texas Tornado (1932) – Rustler (uncredited)
Riders of the Desert (1932) – Singing Ranger (uncredited)
Cowboy Counsellor (1932) – Stage Driver (uncredited)
Five Bad Men (1935) – Radio Buckaroo (uncredited)
Cyclone of the Saddle (1935) – Singer / Fiddler / Townsman (uncredited)
His Fighting Blood (1935) – Singing Constable (uncredited)
Suicide Squad (1935) – Singing Fireman (uncredited)
Flash Gordon (1936) – Robot / Ming's Soldier / Gocko (uncredited)
Trailin' West (1936) – Tim – Henchman / Trooper (uncredited)
A Tenderfoot Goes West (1936) – Cowhand Butch
Song of the Gringo (1936) – Henchman Blackie (uncredited)
Guns of the Pecos (1937) – Wedding Groom / Rustler (uncredited)
Arizona Days (1937) – Henchman Pete
Trouble in Texas (1937) – Middleton Sheriff
The Cherokee Strip (1937) – Harry, Fiddle Player and Band Leader (uncredited)
The Fighting Texan (1937) – Brand-Changing Henchman (uncredited)
Blazing Sixes (1937) – Peewee Jones
Mountain Music (1937) – Singing Hillbilly (uncredited)
Empty Holsters (1937) – Tex Roberts
Riders of the Dawn (1937) – Posse Member (uncredited)
The Devil's Saddle Legion (1937) – Peewee
God's Country and the Man (1937) – Sheriff Joe (uncredited)
Stars Over Arizona (1937) – Bruce Cole (uncredited)
Danger Valley (1937) – Marshal Dale (uncredited)
The Painted Trail (1938) – Sheriff Ed
The Last Stand (1938) – Henchman Joe
Whirlwind Horseman (1938) – Bull – Henchman
Six Shootin' Sheriff (1938) – Kendal Henchman (uncredited)
Black Bandit (1938) – Luke Johnson
Guilty Trails (1938) – New Sheriff
Prairie Justice (1938) – Hank Haynes – Express Agent
Gun Packer (1938) – Sheriff
The Phantom Stage (1939) – Sheriff
The Night Riders (1939) – Angry Riverboat Gambler (uncredited)
Blue Montana Skies (1939) – Bob Causer
Across the Plains (1939) – Jeff Masters
Oklahoma Terror (1939) – Ross Haddon
 Overland Mail (1939) – Sheriff Dawson
 Pioneer Days (1940) – Sheriff
Rhythm of the Rio Grande (1940) – Sheriff Hays
Covered Wagon Trails (1940) – Henchman Fletcher
Pals of the Silver Sage (1940) – Vic Insley
The Cowboy from Sundown (1940) – Bret Stockton
Land of the Six Guns (1940) – Manny
Three Men from Texas (1940) – Ben Stokes
The San Francisco Docks (1940) – Mike
The Bandit Trail (1941) – gang member (uncredited)
The Kid's Last Ride (1941) – Bart Gill, aka Ike Breeden
Fugitive Valley (1941) – Gray
Billy the Kid Wanted (1941) – Matt Brawley
The Driftin' Kid (1941) – Jeff Payson
Lone Star Law Men (1941) – Marshal Scott
Billy the Kid's Round-Up (1941) – Vic Landreau
The Lone Rider and the Bandit (1942) – Luke Miller
 Overland Stagecoach (1942) – Harlen Kent
Western Mail (1942) – Sheriff Big Bill Collins
Stagecoach Buckaroo (1942) – Breck Braddock
Raiders of the West (1942) – Hank Reynolds
Sundown Jim (1942) – Henchman (uncredited)
Sunset on the Desert (1942) – Deputy Louie Meade
Rolling Down the Great Divide (1942) – Joe Duncan
Boot Hill Bandits (1942) – The Maverick
Romance on the Range (1942) – Stokes
Texas Trouble Shooters (1942) – Roger Denby
Overland Stagecoach (1942) – Harlen Kent
 Billy the Kid Trapped (1942) – Boss Stanton
Army Surgeon (1942) – Soldier Having Discussion with Brooklyn (uncredited)
Little Joe, the Wrangler (1942) – Jeff Corey
 The Kid Rides Again (1943) – Henchman Tom Slade
 Haunted Ranch (1943) – Rance Austin
 Black Market Rustlers (1943) – Corbin
 Cattle Stampede (1943) – Stone
 Bullets and Saddles (1943) – Jack Hammond
 Western Cyclone (1943) – Dirk Randall
 Valley of Vengeance (1944) – Marshal Barker
 Harmony Trail (1944) – Marshal Taylor
 House of Frankenstein (1944) – Frankenstein Monster
 House of Dracula (1945) – Frankenstein Monster
 The Wistful Widow of Wagon Gap (1947) – Lefty
 Abbott and Costello Meet Frankenstein (1948) – Frankenstein Monster
 Comin' Round the Mountain (1951) – Devil Dan Winfield

References

External links

 
 Glenn Strange, the B western villain
 TV.com biography 
 "United States Social Security Death Index," database, FamilySearch (https://familysearch.org/ark:/61903/1:1:JT41-TQ9 : 19 May 2014), Glenn Strange, Sep 1973; citing U.S. Social Security Administration, Death Master File, database (Alexandria, Virginia: National Technical Information Service, ongoing).
 Glenn Strange appears on Abbott and Costello's television program
 

1899 births
1973 deaths
Male Western (genre) film actors
American male film actors
Ranchers from New Mexico
American male television actors
People from Otero County, New Mexico
Male actors from New Mexico
People from Brown County, Texas
Male actors from Texas
20th-century American male actors
Western (genre) television actors
Deaths from lung cancer in California
Burials at Forest Lawn Memorial Park (Hollywood Hills)
20th-century American singers
20th-century American male singers
American people of Cherokee descent
American people of Irish descent